The Salalah guitarfish (Rhinobatos salalah) is a species of fish in the Rhinobatidae family. It is nearly endemic to the waters off Oman, with a few records off Pakistan. Its natural habitat is open seas.

Salalah (صَلَالَة Ṣalālah) is a city in southern Oman where the only specimen was obtained at a fish market.

References 

salalah guitarfish
Fish of the Indian Ocean
salalah guitarfish
Taxonomy articles created by Polbot
Taxobox binomials not recognized by IUCN